Mary Porter  may refer to:

 Mary Bea Porter (born 1949), American golfer
 Mary Porter (actress) (died 1765), English  actress
 Mary Porter (politician) (born 1942), Australian politician
 Mary Winearls Porter (1886–1980), English geologist
 Mary G. Porter, American social worker
 Mary Porter, a character from The Vampire Diaries